Ruth Ware (born 1977), alias for Ruth Warburton, is a British psychological thriller author. Her novels include In a Dark, Dark Wood (2015), The Woman in Cabin 10 (2016), The Lying Game (2017), The Death of Mrs Westaway (2018), The Turn of the Key (2019), One By One (2020), and The It Girl (2022). Both In a Dark, Dark Wood and The Woman in Cabin 10 were on the U.K.'s Sunday Times and The New York Times top ten bestseller lists.  She is represented by Eve White of the Eve White Literary Agency. She switched to the pen name Ruth Ware to distinguish her crime novels from the young-adult fantasy novels published under her name, Ruth Warburton.

Personal life
Ruth Ware was born in 1977 and grew up in Lewes. She studied English at Manchester University, where she developed a fascination with Old English and Middle English texts.

Before her writing career, Ware worked as a waitress, a bookseller and a publicist. She also spent time in Paris, teaching English as a foreign language.

Ware now lives near Brighton.

Early career
Before embarking on her writing career as Ruth Ware, Ware wrote five young-adult fantasy novels as Ruth Warburton, all of which were published by Hodder's Children Books.  
 A Witch Alone (2013) 978-1444904710
 A Witch in Winter (2013) 978-1444904697
 A Witch in Love (2013) 978-1444904703 
 Witch Finder (2014) 978-1444914467 
 Witch Hunt (2014) 978-1444914481

Writing style 
In her crime books, Ware's writing style is often compared to that of Agatha Christie. Ware has admitted to being unconsciously influenced by Christie and other mystery novelists of that time. Ware's protagonists are usually ordinary women who find themselves in dangerous situations involving a crime. The first two of Ware's novels feature a murder mystery with a group of people trapped, or otherwise restricted from immediately escaping the dangerous environment.  Christie was famously known for utilizing this plot device, in novels such as Murder on the Orient Express. Ware and Christie both choose settings and situations that foster the sense of dread that propels their characters to paranoia and often they react violently as a result. These environments create a sense of isolation for the events to unfold in. Ware's settings play a key role in drawing in the reader and are as essential and integral to her story as the characters.

Works

Ware has written seven psychological thrillers, :

In a Dark, Dark Wood (2015) is about a woman who attends a bachelorette party (hen do) of a childhood friend whom she hasn't heard from in years. The party takes place in an isolated glass house in the woods and takes a turn for the worse. By the end of the weekend someone is dead and everyone is a suspect.

The Woman in Cabin 10 (2016) is about Laura "Lo" Blacklock, a travel journalist who goes on the maiden voyage of the Aurora Borealis, a luxury cruise ship, for an assignment in the Norwegian fjords. Lo is on the trip to further her career, but everything changes when she witnesses what she believes to be woman being thrown overboard, yet all the passengers remain accounted for and no one believes her.

The Lying Game (2017) revolves around four girls named Kate Atagon, Fatima Chaudhry (née Qureshy), Thea West, and Isa Wilde who attend a private boarding school called Salten House. At the school, they form a bond from a game of telling lies. The poor actions of the girls' boarding school days resurface years later when they receive a mysterious text from Kate asking them to return to the mill where they hung out as teenagers.

The Death of Mrs Westaway (2018) is about Hal, a young tarot card reader, who receives a mysterious and large inheritance. When Hal attends the funeral of the deceased it becomes clear that she was not the intended recipient of the inheritance and that she has become involved in a dangerous mystery.

The Turn of the Key (2019) is about a nanny and four children, written as if updating Henry James's The Turn of the Screw in a 21st-century setting.

One by One (2020) revolves around the directors and shareholders of a hot new technology company on a corporate retreat at an exclusive ski resort to decide the future of the company. Tensions run high approaching a possible billion-dollar buyout as an avalanche cuts the chalet off from help, and one board member goes missing.

The IT Girl (2022) is about Hannah dealing with evidence that her university friend's murder may still be unsolved a decade after it occurred.

Film and television adaptations 
Three of Ware's books have been optioned for screen.  
 In a Dark, Dark Wood (2015): New Line Cinema has acquired film rights. Reese Witherspoon's Pacific Standard is attached to produce.
 The Woman in Cabin 10 (2016): CBS has acquired film rights, and is set to produce the film with the Gotham Group. Screenwriter Hillary Seitz is attached.
 The Lying Game (2017): Entertainment One has acquired television rights to The Lying Game.

Accolades
Ware's novels have won or been nominated for a number of awards and end-of-year lists:
 In a Dark, Dark Wood (2015)
 A BEA Buzz Panel selection
 An NPR best book of 2015
 RT Reviewer's Choice Award for Best Suspense Novel
 The Woman in Cabin 10 (2016)
 Nominated for the 2016 Goodreads Choice Awards Best Mystery & Thriller
 2016 Book of the Year Finalist selected by Book of the Month
 One by One (2020)
 Shortlisted for the 2021 Ian Fleming Steel Dagger Award at the Crime Writers Association Awards

Critical reception 
Reviews of Ruth Ware's psychological crime thrillers have been generally positive. The Independent named In A Dark, Dark Wood as "this year's hottest crime novel". The Guardian praised In A Dark, Dark Wood'''s "excellent characterisation" and called the book's ending "mesmerising". The Independent described The Lying Game as "gripping enough to be devoured in a single sitting," in a four-star review. In a starred review, Kirkus Reviews'' writer said "cancel your plans for the weekend when you sit down with this book, because you won’t want to move until it’s over."

References 

British crime writers
1977 births
Living people
Alumni of the University of Manchester
People from Lewes
Women crime writers
21st-century British novelists
21st-century British women writers
British women novelists
Pseudonymous women writers
21st-century pseudonymous writers